The  Georgia Force season was the fifth season for the team in the Arena Football League. They finished with a record of 8–8, and lost in the second round of the playoffs.

Coaching
Doug Plank, head coach since 2005, entered his second year as Force head coach.

Stats

Offense

Quarterback

Running backs

Wide receivers

Touchdowns

Defense

Special teams

Kick return

Kicking

External links

Georgia
Georgia Force seasons
2006 in sports in Georgia (U.S. state)